Terrance Victor Carisse (July 11, 1942 – May 22, 2005) known as Terry Carisse, was one of Canadian Country Music's most awarded, decorated and popular singer-songwriters. His awards include the Canadian Country Music Association's Male Vocalist of the Year Award which he has won six times, and still holds this record. He was nominated four times for a Juno Award. In 1989 he was inducted into the Ottawa Valley Country Music Hall of Fame. In 2006, Terry Carisse was inducted into the Canadian Country Music Hall of Fame.

Biography

Early life
Carisse was born Terrance Victor Carisse July 11, 1942 in Ottawa, Ontario, Canada. He started performing in his early teens. at several local talent shows and festivals in the Ottawa Valley.

Career
In 1971, Carisse teamed up with fellow songwriter Bruce Rawlins. The duo wrote their first hit song together "Hello Mom" for the Mercey Brothers.

Beginning in 1978, Carisse and his band, Tenderfoot, were the opening act for Carroll Baker, performing concert dates in Canada, Great Britain, including the London Palladium. After performing as part of the Carroll Baker show from 1978 to 1980, he began a solo career. In 1980, Carisse left the Carroll Baker Show to tour with his new band, Tracks. Performing in such venues as the Calgary Stampede, the Big Valley Jamboree in Regina, fairs in Lethbridge and Charlottetown, and the first-ever national telecast of the Canadian Country Music Awards(CCMA). Carisse and his band Tracks opened for Kenny Rogers and Dolly Parton in Atlantic Canada and toured with, among many others, Larry Gatlin and the Gatlin Brothers, Conway Twitty, Loretta Lynn, Tammy Wynette, Mel Tillis, and Willie Nelson. Carisse has appeared in numerous shows including The Family Brown, The Tommy Hunter Show and the International Country Music Festival in Peterborough, England as well as writing and performing three songs on "The Rowdyman" film starring Gordon Pinsent. He recorded his first album on the Mercey Brothers' MBS label and later recorded with Savannah Records. Over the years, Carisse has released six albums and numerous singles, initially on the Mercey Brothers MBS label and, subsequently, on Savannah Records. His songs have been recorded by Carroll Baker, Marie Bottrell, Ralph Carlson, Bruce Golden, "Whispering Bill" Anderson, Charlie Louvin, Australian country singer, Allan Hawking, the Netherlands' Esther Tims, and Sweden's Teddy Nelson, and his songs have been released in Germany, Australia, Switzerland, Belgium, the Netherlands and Luxembourg.
In 1989 Terry was inducted into the Ottawa Valley Country Music Hall of Fame and in 2006 he was inducted into The Canadian Country Music Hall of Fame.

Carisse died of cancer on May 22, 2005 in an Ottawa hospital; he was 62. Carisse is survived by his wife Aija (Skadins) and sons Steve, Chris, and Sean and a brother, Stephen.

Discography

Albums

Singles

References 

1942 births
2005 deaths
Canadian Country Music Association Male Artist of the Year winners
Canadian country singer-songwriters
Canadian male singer-songwriters
Deaths from cancer in Ontario
Musicians from Ottawa
20th-century Canadian male singers